Empress Dowager Ma (1578–1669), personal name unknown, formally known as Empress Dowager Zhaosheng, was an empress dowager of the Chinese Southern Ming dynasty. She was the birth mother of the Yongli Emperor. She converted to Roman Catholicism and adopted the name Maria.

References

Ming dynasty empresses dowager
Southern Ming empresses
1578 births
1669 deaths
Converts to Roman Catholicism
17th-century Chinese women
17th-century Chinese people
Sichuanese Roman Catholics